Francisco de Artiga, a celebrated Spanish landscape and historical painter, was born at Huesca, about 1650. He painted several 'Sibyls,' 'Conceptions,' and perspective views, remarkable for their invention, design, and colouring. He was also an engraver, an architect, a mathematician, and an author of reputation. He died in 1711 at Huesca.

References
 

Year of birth uncertain
1650 births
1711 deaths
People from Huesca
17th-century engravers
18th-century engravers
17th-century Spanish painters
Spanish male painters
18th-century Spanish painters
18th-century Spanish male artists
Spanish engravers
17th-century Spanish architects
17th-century Spanish mathematicians
Spanish male writers